Dickinsonia is an extinct genus of basal animal that lived during the late Ediacaran period in what is now Australia, China, Russia and Ukraine. The individual Dickinsonia typically resembles a bilaterally symmetrical ribbed oval. Its affinities are presently unknown; its mode of growth is consistent with a stem-group bilaterian affinity, though some have suggested that it belongs to the fungi, or even an "extinct kingdom". The discovery of cholesterol molecules in fossils of Dickinsonia lends support to the idea that Dickinsonia was an animal.

Description

Dickinsonia fossils are known only in the form of imprints and casts in sandstone beds.

They are nearly bilaterally symmetric, segmented, round or oval in outline, slightly expanded to one end (i.e. egg-shaped outline). The rib-like segments are radially inclined towards the wide and narrow ends, and the width and length of the segments increases towards the wide end of the fossil. The segments are separated by a thin ridge or groove along the axis of symmetry into right and left halves. The segments are organized in an alternating pattern according to glide reflection symmetry rather than bilateral symmetry; thus, these "segments" are isomers. This glide reflection is also found in Spriggina, Yorgia, Andiva, Cephalonega and other relatives of a Dickinsonia from the extinct Phylum Proarticulata.

The segments of Dickinsonia have been described by Adolf Seilacher as self-organising "pneu structures", chambers filled with a liquid at higher than ambient pressure, analogous to a quilted air mattress.

Some spectacular fossils attributed to Dickinsonia appear to preserve internal anatomy, believed to represent a tract that both digested food and distributed it throughout the organism.

Discovery and naming 

The first species and specimens of this fossil organism were first discovered in the Ediacara Member of the Rawnsley Quartzite, Flinders Ranges in South Australia. Additional specimens of Dickinsonia are also known from the Mogilev Formation in the Dniester River Basin of Podolia, Ukraine, the Lyamtsa, Verkhovka, Zimnegory and Yorga Formations in the White Sea area of the Arkhangelsk Region, Chernokamen Formation of the Central Urals, Russia, (these deposits have been dated to 567–550 Myr.), the Dengying Formation in the Yangtze Gorges area, South China. (ca. 551–543 Ma) 

Reg Sprigg, the original discoverer of the Ediacaran biota in Australia, described Dickinsonia, naming it  after Ben Dickinson, then Director of Mines for South Australia, and head of the government department that employed Sprigg.

Body fossils

As a rule, Dickinsonia fossils are preserved as negative impressions (“death masks”) on the bases of sandstone beds. Such fossils are imprints of the upper sides of the benthic organisms that have been buried under the sand. The imprints formed as a result of cementation of the sand before complete decomposition of the body. The mechanism of cementation is not quite clear; among many possibilities, the process could have arisen from conditions which gave rise to pyrite "death masks" on the decaying body, or perhaps it was due to the carbonate cementation of the sand. The imprints of the bodies of organisms are often strongly compressed, distorted, and sometimes partly extend into the overlying rock. These deformations appear to show attempts by the organisms to escape from the falling sediment.

Rarely, Dickinsonia have been preserved as a cast in massive sandstone lenses, where it occurs together with Pteridinium, Rangea and some others. These specimens are products of events where organisms were first stripped from the sea-floor, transported and deposited within sand flow. In such cases, stretched and ripped Dickinsonia occur. The first such specimen was described as a separate genus and species, Chondroplon bilobatum and later re-identified as Dickinsonia.

Trace fossils
Several trace fossils, including Epibaion and Phyllozoon, have been interpreted as feeding impressions of Dickinsonia and its relatives. Such fossils consist of large, rounded impressions with less relief than the usual upper side of these animals.

Taxonomy
Since 1947, a total of nine species have been described, of which three are currently considered valid:
{| class="wikitable sortable"
|-
! Species !! Authority !! Location !! Status !! Notes
|-
| Dickinsonia brachina  || Wade, 1972 || Australia || invalid || Synonym of Dickinsonia tenuis
|-
| Dickinsonia costata  || Sprigg, 1947 || Australia, Russia and Ukraine || valid || Unlike other species, D. costata has comparatively rounded body and fewer, wider segments / isomers.
|-
| Dickinsonia elongata  || Glaessner & Wade, 1966 || Australia || invalid ||Synonym of Dickinsonia costata 
|-
| Dickinsonia lissa || Wade, 1972 || Australia || invalid || Synonym of Dickinsonia tenuis 
|-
| Dickinsonia menneri || Keller, 1976 || Russia || valid || D. menneri is a small organism up to 8 mm in length, and strongly resembles juvenile specimens of D. costata with its small number of isomers and well-marked head. D. menneri differs from juvenile D. costata by its slightly more elongated form. 
Originally classified as Vendomia, it was re-identified as Dickinsonia by Ivantsov (2007)
|-
| Dickinsonia minima  || Sprigg, 1949 || Australia || invalid || Synonym of Dickinsonia costata 
|-
| Dickinsonia rex  || Jenkins, 1992 || Australia || invalid ||Synonym of Dickinsonia tenuis 
|-
| Dickinsonia spriggi  || Harrington & Moore, 1955 || Australia || invalid ||Synonym of Dickinsonia costata 
|-
| Dickinsonia tenuis  || Glaessner & Wade, 1966 || Australia and Russia || valid || Strongly resembles D. costata, but differs from it by more narrow and numerous segments, sparingly lengthened oval form of the body.
|}

Classification

The affinities of Dickinsonia are uncertain. It has been variously interpreted as a jellyfish, coral, polychaete worm, turbellarian, mushroom, xenophyophoran protist, sea anemone, lichen, and even a close ancestor of the chordates.
Genera such as Yorgia and Marywadea somewhat resemble Dickinsonia, and may be related. However, it is possible that Dickinsonia falls into a group of organisms that became extinct before the Cambrian. Its construction is loosely similar to other Ediacaran organisms, and the similarity of their architecture suggests that dickinsoniamorphs may belong in a clade with Charnia and other rangeomorphs.
Paleontologist Adolph Seilacher even went so far as to suggest that most of the Ediacaran fauna represents a separate Kingdom termed "Vendozoa" (now: "Vendobionta") that thrived just before most of the modern multicellular animal phyla appeared in the fossil record.

There is an argument that Dickinsonia is more derived than a sponge, but less so than a eumetazoan. The idea that these organisms could move depends on whether Epibaion is its trace fossil or just a different preservation state.
It lacks any convincing evidence for a mouth, anus or gut, and appears to have fed by absorption on its bottom surface, much like modern placozoans do. The placozoans are simple animals which absorb food through their bottom surface ("feed through the soles of their feet") and are tentatively placed phylogenetically between sponges and eumetazoa; this suggests that Dickinsonia may have been a stem-group placozoan, or somewhere more crown-wards than sponges on the eumetazoan stem.

A study of inferred growth patterns determined that Dickinsonia is a eumetazoan but a more accurate affiliation was not established.
In a subsequent study Hoyal Cuthill & Han (2018) assigned Dickinsonia to the extinct animal group Petalonamae (placed as sister group to the Eumetazoa), which also included the genera Stromatoveris, Arborea and Pambikalbae, as well as rangeomorphs and erniettomorphs.

Interpretation as lichens and taphomorphs
Retallack (2007) proposed that some Ediacaran fossils were lichens, based on their unusual resistance to post-burial compaction. He suggests that the decay mode of the organisms most closely resembles that of leaves, fungi, or lichens, rather than soft-bodied animals, whose bodies clot and distort as they wilt and decay.

A detailed study of paleosols with Dickinsonia preserved in life position suggests, according to Retallack, that Dickinsonia could have lived on dry land. In addition, Dickinsonia and other Ediacaran fossils are found on and beneath eolian laminae of the kind known only on exposed sandy river banks. These proposals are not universally accepted. A paper announcing the discovery of cholesteroids in Dickinsonia fossils states: "Lichen-forming fungi only produce ergosteroids, and even in those that host symbiotic algae, ergosteroids remain the major sterols. Dickinsonia contained [either none] or a maximum of only 0.23% ergosteroids, conclusively refuting the lichen hypothesis".

Paleobiology
Under Retallack's (2007) hypothesis, the Dickinsonia spent most, if not all, of their lives with most of their bodies firmly anchored to the sediment, although they may have slowly moved from resting-place to resting-place. Their mode of anchorage may have been oyster-like concretion, lichen-like rooting with rhizines, or fungus-like attachment to an underground network of hyphae. Dickinsonia displayed isometric, indeterminate growth – that is to say, they kept growing until they were covered with sediment or otherwise killed.

The organisms are preserved in such a way that their resistant parts must have been a sturdy biopolymer (such as keratin) rather than a brittle mineral (such as calcite or a pyritized "death mask").

Halo-like "reaction rims" surround specimens; adjacent specimens deform, as if to avoid entering their neighbour's halo, suggesting they competed with one another. No overlapping body fossils have been found.

Trace fossils
They may be impressions the organism made while it rested on the sediment surface – perhaps by secreting slime in order to form a platform on the underlying microbial mat, or by sitting and dissolving the underlying microbes in order to devour them.

They have also been interpreted as "tumble tracks" created by an organism rolling along the sea floor, perhaps as it was buffeted by currents, and as the bases of lichens or "mushrooms arranged in fairy rings". However, in some cases these trackway imprints overlap. Ridges apparently produced by the channelling of sediment in digestive tubes also indicate body disruption. Thus an alternative interpretation is that Epibaion are dead individuals dislodged into rings by frost boils in periglacial paleosols. By this view, Epibaion is not a trace fossil, but rather a decayed body fossil (a taphomorph).

See also
 List of Ediacaran genera

References 

Dipleurozoa
Ediacaran life
White Sea fossils
Fossil taxa described in 1947